Smilgiai is a small town in Panevėžys County, in northeastern Lithuania. According to the 2011 census, the town has a population of 544 people.

Before The Holocaust the town had a Jewish population but they were murdered by the Einsatzgruppen and their Lithuanian collaborators.

Towns in Lithuania
Towns in Panevėžys County
Ponevezhsky Uyezd
Holocaust locations in Lithuania
Panevėžys District Municipality